Mariana is a Roman site south of Biguglia, in the Haute-Corse département of the Corsica région of south-east France.  It lies in the littoral area known as La Marana, near the present town of Lucciana. There are two old churches in the area — the Church of Santa Maria Assunta and San Parteo Church.

History 
It was founded in 93 BC as a military colony.  Saint Devota, patron saint of Corsica and Monaco, is said to have been martyred here in 303 AD.

References

External links 

La Marana

History of Corsica
Roman towns and cities in France
Former populated places in France
Geography of Haute-Corse